Blau is a German surname meaning "blue". This may have referred to the pale skin, the eyes, or the clothes of the original bearer of the name or the surname may be metonymic, e.g. referring to a dyer or someone who produced bluing in a mill. "Blau" is most commonly an ornamental Jewish (Ashkenazic) surname. Notable people with the surname include:
Alfred Blau (died 1896), French dramatist and opera librettist
Amram Blau (1894–1974), Israeli Neturei Karta rabbi
Dick Blau (born 1943), American photographer and film maker
Édouard Blau (1836–1906), French dramatist and opera librettist
Eric Blau (1921–2009), American novelist and dramatist
Francine D. Blau (born 1946), American economist
Freda Meissner-Blau (born 1927), Austrian politician and activist
Haralds Blaus (1885–1945), Latvian sports shooter
Harvey R. Blau (1935–2018), American attorney and business executive
Helen Blau (born 1948), American biochemist
Herbert Blau (1926–2013), director and theoretician of performance
Hermann Blau (1871–1944), German engineer and chemist, and inventor of Blau gas
Jenö Blau, later Eugene Ormandy (1899–1985), Hungarian-American conductor and violinist
Joyce Blau (born 1932), French Kurdologist
Joseph Leon Blau (1909–1986), American scholar of Jewish history and philosophy
Joshua Blau (born 1919), Israeli scholar of Arabic language and literature
Judith Blau (born 1942), American sociologist
Justin David Blau (born 1991), American DJ known as 3LAU
Karl Blau, American musician
Lajos Bíró (born Blau), (1880–1948),  Hungarian novelist, playwright, and screenwriter
Lajos Blau, Hungarian scholar and publicist
Leslie Blau, Hungarian  author, historian, and survivor of the Holocaust
Marietta Blau (1894–1970), Austrian physicist
Max Blau (1918–1984), Swiss chess player
Peter Blau (1918–2002), Austrian Jewish sociologist
Rachel Blau DuPlessis (born 1941), American poet and essayist
Raphael Blau (1912–1996), American screenwriter
Rolf Blau (born 1952), German football midfielder
Sarah Blau (born 1973), Israeli author, journalist, playwright, and actress
Theodore H. Blau (1928–2003), American clinical and forensic psychologist
Tina Blau (1845–1916), Austrian landscape painter
Uri Blau (born 1977), Israeli journalist and investigative reporter
Yaakov Blau (1929–2013), Israeli rabbi 
Yosef Blau, American Orthodox rabbi, president of the Religious Zionists of America

See also
Blaauw, Dutch surname with the same meaning

References